{{DISPLAYTITLE:C20H20O9}}
The molecular formula C20H20O9 (molar mass: 404.36 g/mol, exact mass: 404.110732 u) may refer to:

 Brickellin, an O-methylated flavonol
 Trans-resveratrol-3-O-glucuronide, a stilbenoid
 

Molecular formulas